Class 110 may refer to:

 British Rail Class 110 diesel multiple unit
 DB Class E 10 locomotive of German national rail system